Sophie Alexandra Hemming (born 20 June 1980) was an English rugby union player with 71 caps. She represented  at the 2010 Women's Rugby World Cup and was also named in the squad to the 2014 Women's Rugby World Cup. She also won the RFU Linda Uttley Award in recognition of her dedication and commitment.

Hemming attended Norwich High School for Girls. Outside rugby, Hemming is a veterinarian. Her rugby career required for her to make significant adjustments to her profession, transitioning from a farmyard to a domestic vet. She said that this change helped her plan her training and reduced the physical exhaustion that came with her demanding job of treating farm animals.

Currently, she is a national Elite XC bike racer for BW Cycling.

References

External links
English player profile
Sophie Hemming featured in The Telegraph UK
Sophie Hemming speaks on 2010 World Cup

1980 births
Living people
England women's international rugby union players
English female rugby union players
Female rugby union players
Rugby union players from Norwich